Dr. Simon Ungar (1864–1942) was a doctor of oriental medicine and rabbi of the Osijek Jewish Community who was killed during the Holocaust.

Ungar was born in Máramarossziget, Kingdom of Hungary (now Sighetu Marmației, Romania) to an Orthodox Jewish family. His family spoke Yiddish. After he was educated by his father, a teacher, Ungar continued studying Talmud. At the same time he also learned Hungarian language. Ungar continued his high school education in Budapest, Hungary. He also attended rabbinical seminar and studied at the Budapest Faculty of Philosophy. Ungar was fluent in Yiddish, Hebrew, Croatian, Hungarian, Serbian, German and Latin. Upon completing his education Ungar was rabbi in Szekszárd, Hungary. In 1901 he was appointed as the chief rabbi of the Osijek Jewish Community. He was very active in the Osijek Jewish community and actively participated in the Osijek's cultural and social life. In 1942 Ungar was arrested, he died during deportation in the cattle wagon routed to Jasenovac concentration camp.

References

Bibliography

 

1864 births
1942 deaths
People from Sighetu Marmației
Austro-Hungarian Jews
Croatian people of Romanian-Jewish descent
20th-century Croatian rabbis
People who died in Jasenovac concentration camp
Croatian civilians killed in World War II
Modern Orthodox rabbis
Croatian Jews who died in the Holocaust
Croatian Orthodox rabbis